You Can't Do That on Stage Anymore, Vol. 5 is a double compact disc collection of live recordings (except for "German Lunch" and "My Guitar" which are studio recordings) by Frank Zappa. Disc one comprises performances by The Mothers of Invention spanning the period from 1966 to 1969. "My Guitar" had been previously released as a single in 1969. Disc two comprises performances from the summer 1982 tour of Europe. It was released in 1992 (see 1992 in music) under the label Rykodisc. The last track on this collection ends with Zappa's anger at some audience members tossing cigarettes on stage; after a warning to stop was not obeyed, the disc ends with Zappa stating, "Houselights! The concert's over!"

Track listing

Personnel 
 Frank Zappa – conductor, guitar, lyricist, remixing, producer, main performer, liner notes, vocals
 Dick Kunc – vocals, voices, engineer
 Kanzus J. Kanzus – vocals, voices
 Dick Barber – vocals, voices, sound effects
 Lowell George – guitar, vocals
 Ray White – guitar, vocals
 Steve Vai – guitar
 Elliot Ingber – guitar
 Tommy Mars – keyboards, vocals
 Don Preston – electronics, keyboards
 Roy Estrada – bass guitar, vocals
 Scott Thunes – bass guitar
 Billy Mundi – drums
 Art Tripp – drums
 Chad Wackerman – drums
 Jimmy Carl Black – drums, vocals, voices
 Ed Mann – percussion
 Ray Collins – tambourine
 Ian Underwood  – clarinet, alto saxophone, electric piano, piano
 Bobby Martin – saxophone, vocals, keyboards
 Bunk Gardner – tenor saxophone, trumpet
 Motorhead Sherwood – baritone saxophone, vocals
 Noel Redding – dancer
 John Judnich – engineer
 Bob Stone – remixing

References

External links 
 Lyrics and information
 Release details

Live at the Fillmore East albums
Frank Zappa live albums
1992 live albums
Rykodisc live albums
Sequel albums